Tudum: A Global Fan Event, also known as Netflix Tudum or Tudum Festival, is a pop culture event that covers Netflix's original films and television series. Held for the first time in January 2020, the event is presented by Maisa Silva and brings singers, actors and actresses from Netflix to promote new work, meet and play with the Brazilian public. Currently, the festival has had four editions.

History

First edition 
The first edition, in January 2020, was held in São Paulo, Brazil, with a public of over 50,000 people during the four days and big names from the original Netflix productions such as Lana Condor, Noah Centineo, Larissa Manoela and Jottapê, with concerts by Anavitória, Melim, Projota, Kevin o Chris, Gretchen and Tropkillaz. The event brought together sets from various series, such as Stranger Things, Sex Education and Sintonia, so that the public had an immersive experience and could feel part of their favorite series.

Second edition 
The second edition, in November 2020, was carried out entirely online, given the circumstances of social distancing and quarantine caused by the COVID-19 pandemic. Netflix decided to create an online version of the festival presented by Maisa Silva and names of their original productions such as Ashley Park, Lucas Bravo, Joel Courtney and Leah Lewis with concerts by Marília Mendonça, Pabllo Vittar, Emicida, Jottapê and Mila. The event also gained an Almanac version that was distributed physically and digitally, with the aim of expanding the event and covering the entire national territory. Netflix held the virtual edition for free as well as distributing 100,000 copies of an almanac with several stories, games and activities about the series and movies.

Third edition 
The third edition, in September 2021, was named "Tudum: A Global Fan Event", an online event that includes audiences from other countries. The event was broadcast on YouTube, Facebook and Twitch on September 25.

Fourth edition 
The event was broadcast on September 24th 2022.

Tudum (website) 
On December 9, 2021, Netflix announced the launch of a website named after the annual event, an official companion website that offers news, exclusive interviews and behind-the-scenes videos for its original television shows and films.

See also 
 D23 Expo
 DC FanDome

References

External links 

 

2020 establishments in Brazil
Annual events
Entertainment events in Brazil
Events in São Paulo
Festivals established in 2020
Netflix